Greg Freeman is an English playwright and television writer.

He is known for his critically acclaimed absurd and satirical plays, prompting Time Out London to dub him "batshit mental king of the dark fringe".

Freeman's notable works include Doig the Musical: With No Singing, No Dancing and Very Little Music,} Beak Street, No Picnic and Dogstar.

In 2013, he and Lila Whelan were commissioned by Tacit Theatre to adapt Arthur Conan Doyle's A Study in Scarlet for the stage. It premiered at Southwark Playhouse in 2014.

Freeman also successfully adapted the US sitcom Who's the Boss? for British television; it was renamed The Upper Hand and ran for seven seasons.

He is the son of Dave Freeman.

Works

Theatre

 1999: Take - Old Red Lion, 1999
 2003: Kathmandu - The Menier Chocolate Factory, 2003
 2006: Spite The Face - Baby Belly Edinburgh, 2006
 2007: Wake Up And Smell The Coffee - New End Theatre, 2007
 2009: Doig the Musical: With No Singing, No Dancing and Very Little Music - Tabard Theatre, 2009
 2010: Beak Street - Tabard Theatre, 2010
 2012: No Picnic - Tabard Theatre, 2012
 2013: Dogstar - Tabard Theatre, 2013
 2014: A Study in Scarlet - The Southwark Playhouse, 2014
 2015: The Ballad of Robin Hood - The Southwark Playhouse, 2015
 2015: Empty Vessels - Rosemary Branch, 2015
 2016: Sherlock Holmes and The Invisible Thing - Tabard Theatre, 2016
 2017: Montagu - Tabard Theatre, 2017

References

Sources

External links 
Greg Freeman's official website
Doig! The Musical timeout review

English television writers
English dramatists and playwrights
Living people
English male dramatists and playwrights
British male television writers
Year of birth missing (living people)